Keith Izatt (born 12 March 1964) is a Canadian former soccer player who played college soccer for Simon Fraser University, professionally for Vancouver 86ers, Edmonton Brick Men, and Winnipeg Fury and internationally for the Canadian national team.

References

1964 births
Living people
Sportspeople from North Vancouver
Soccer people from British Columbia
Canada men's international soccer players
Canadian soccer players
Simon Fraser Clan men's soccer players
Vancouver Whitecaps (1986–2010) players
Canadian Soccer League (1987–1992) players
Association footballers not categorized by position
Edmonton Brick Men players
Winnipeg Fury players